Amos 9 is the ninth (and the last) chapter of the Book of Amos in the Hebrew Bible or the Old Testament of the Christian Bible. This book contains the prophecies attributed to the prophet Amos; in particular, the seventh, eighth, and ninth chapters contain visions and their explanations. It is a part of the Book of the Twelve Minor Prophets.

Text 
The original text was written in Hebrew language. This chapter is divided into 15 verses.

Textual witnesses
Some early manuscripts containing the text of this chapter in Hebrew are of the Masoretic Text tradition, which includes the Codex Cairensis (895), the Petersburg Codex of the Prophets (916), and Codex Leningradensis (1008).

Fragments containing parts of this chapter were found among the Dead Sea Scrolls including 4Q82 (4QXIIg; 25 BCE) with extant verses 1, 5–6, 14–15; and Wadi Murabba'at (MurXII; 75–100 CE) with extant verses 1–15.

There is also a translation into Koine Greek known as the Septuagint, made in the last few centuries BCE. Extant ancient manuscripts of the Septuagint version include Codex Vaticanus (B; B; 4th century), Codex Alexandrinus (A; A; 5th century) and Codex Marchalianus (Q; Q; 6th century).

Verse 9
 For, lo, I will command,
 and I will sift the house of Israel among all nations,
 like as corn is sifted in a sieve,
 yet shall not the least grain fall upon the earth.
 "Sift": The Israelites were to be tossed about through all nations as corn is shaken about in a sieve, in such a way, however, that while the chaff and dust (the wicked) fall through (perish), all the solid grains (the godly elect) remain (are preserved),. So spiritual Israel's final safety is ensured.

Verse 11
[The Lord says:] "In that day will I raise up the tabernacle of David that is fallen,
and close up the breaches thereof;
and I will raise up his ruins,
and I will build it as in the days of old:"
This verse is quoted by James, brother of Jesus (mostly from the Greek translation) to confirm that the Church of God is open to all people, Jews or Gentiles.
 "The tabernacle": (Hebrew: sukkah) or "hut", "tent" (as ); a "little house". 
 "Fallen...breaches...ruins" In the Talmud the Messiah (in Greek: "Christ") is called "the Son of the fallen." Amos heaps upon one another the words implying destruction, referring to the fall of David's kingdom into ruins by the Chaldeans, but the fallen "hut of David" will be "raised up", "'their (feminine form)' breaches" will be "closed up" (literally "walled up") and "'his' ruins," will be "built" up by God "that 'they' (masculine form; verse 12) may inherit". Using a variety of numbers and genders, this verse and the next one speak of one living whole, the 'Jewish Church', that once was "breached" in two by the great schism of Jeroboam, but will be reunited into one body, "as in the days of old", before the separation of the ten tribes, when all Israel worshiped as one. Interpreted spiritually, it foreshadows the rising of the universal Church of Christ from that of the Jews.

Verse 12
"that they may possess the remnant of Edom
and all the nations who are called by my name,"
declares the Lord who does this.
Acts 15:17).

Verse 14
 And I will bring again the captivity of my people of Israel,
 and they shall build the waste cities, and inhabit them;
 and they shall plant vineyards, and drink the wine thereof;
 they shall also make gardens, and eat the fruit of them.
 "And I will bring again the captivity of my people of Israel": This does not refer to the captivity of the Jews in Babylon, or the disposition by the Romans, when the Jews were dispersed among the nations again; but the captivity both of Judah and Israel that the Jews will be brought back, and delivered from it, to return to their own land, and possess it as long as it is a land; see ; as well as be freed from the bondage of Satan and the law, under which they have been detained some hundreds of years; but now shall be delivered into the glorious liberty of the children of God.
 "build the waste cities":.

See also

Related Bible parts: Amos 2, Amos 7, Amos 8, Acts 15

Notes

References

Sources

External links

Jewish
Amos 9 Hebrew with Parallel English
Amos 9 Hebrew with Rashi's Commentary

Christian
Amos 9 English Translation with Parallel Latin Vulgate

09